Raj Angad Bawa (born 12 November 2002) is an Indian cricketer. He made his first-class cricket debut for Chandigarh in February 2022 in the 2021–22 Ranji Trophy, taking a wicket with his first delivery. He has played for the India national under-19 cricket team, including at the 2022 ICC Under-19 Cricket World Cup and 2021 ACC Under-19 Asia Cup.

Early life 
Raj Bawa was born in Nahan, Himachal Pradesh and grew up in Chandigarh. He is the grandson of Trilochan Singh Bawa, a member of the Olympic gold-winning Indian hockey team from the London 1948 Games.

Career 
Bawa played under-19 cricket for Chandigarh. He made his first-class debut on 17 February 2022 against Hyderabad in the Ranji Trophy, taking a wicket with his first delivery. Before making his senior debut, Bawa had been bought by Punjab Kings in the 2022 IPL auction ahead of the 2022 Indian Premier League. He made his Twenty20 debut on 27 March 2022, for Punjab Kings in the 2022 Indian Premier League.

References

External links 

2002 births
Living people
Indian cricketers
Cricketers from Chandigarh
Chandigarh cricketers
Punjab Kings cricketers